This is the complete list of Asian Winter Games medalists in ski-orienteering in 2011.

Men

Sprint

Middle distance

Long distance

Relay

Women

Sprint

Middle distance

Long distance

Relay

References

Ski orienteering
medalists